Morfa Borth is a small village in the  community of Borth, Ceredigion, Wales, which is 78.7 miles (126.6 km) from Cardiff and 179.9 miles (289.6 km) from London. Morfa Borth is represented in the Senedd by Elin Jones (Plaid Cymru) and is part of the Ceredigion constituency in the House of Commons.

Etymology
"Morfa" is the Welsh word for "reclaimed land from the sea"; Borth, being a nearby village.

References

See also
List of localities in Wales by population

Villages in Ceredigion